Rhaptopetalum beguei is a species of plant in the family Lecythidaceae. It is found in Cameroon, Côte d'Ivoire, Equatorial Guinea, Gabon, Ghana, and Nigeria.

References

beguei
Least concern plants
Taxonomy articles created by Polbot